James Madison Hite Beale (February 7, 1786 – August 2, 1866) was a slave owner and  U.S. Representative from Virginia.

Biography
Born in Mount Airy, Virginia, Beale pursued preparatory studies.
He engaged in agricultural pursuits.
He served as member of the State house of delegates from 1818 to 1819.

Beale was elected as a Jacksonian to the Twenty-third and Twenty-fourth Congresses (March 4, 1833 – March 3, 1837).
He served as chairman of the Committee on Invalid Pensions (Twenty-fourth Congress).
He resumed agricultural pursuits.

Beale was elected as a Democrat to the Thirty-first and Thirty-second Congresses (March 4, 1849 – March 3, 1853).
He served as chairman of the Committee on Expenditures on Public Buildings (Thirty-first Congress), Committee on Manufactures (Thirty-second Congress).
He declined to be a candidate for renomination in 1852.
He resumed agricultural pursuits.
He died in Putnam County, W.Virginia, August 2, 1866.
He was interred in Beale Cemetery, near Gallipolis Ferry, Mason County, W.Virginia.

References

Sources

1786 births
1866 deaths
People from Shenandoah County, Virginia
American people of English descent
Jacksonian members of the United States House of Representatives from Virginia
Democratic Party members of the United States House of Representatives from Virginia
American slave owners
People from Putnam County, West Virginia